Shackell is a surname. Notable people with the surname include:

Jason Shackell (born 1983), English footballer
Keith Shackell (born 1935), English rower
Nicholas Shackell (born 1974), English swimmer
Robin Shackell, acting Governor of Pitcairn